Han Sun-soo (Hangul: 한선수; born December 16, 1985 in Bucheon, Gyeonggi-do) is a volleyball player from South Korea. He currently plays the setter position for the Incheon Korean Air Jumbos in the V-League.

Career

Clubs
After playing college volleyball at Hanyang University, Han was selected sixth overall by the Korean Air Jumbos in the 2007 V-League Draft. Before the draft, You Kwang-woo of Inha University and Han were widely considered the two best setters available in the 2007 draft, and scouts and analysts debated who should be selected first. While most deemed You the more experienced setter and the safer pick, many favored Han's taller stature and greater setting speed. Eventually, You was drafted second by the Samsung Bluefangs and Han sixth by the Korean Air Jumbos.

After having a mediocre rookie season as a backup, Han was escalated to the starting setter for the Jumbos in 2008–09 season, racking up 1,181 total assists and averaging 10.74 per set.
 
Throughout the V-League career, Han was named Best Setter three times, and set the Jumbos to the V-League regular season champions twice, in 2010–11 and 2016–17.

National team
In 2009 Han first got called up to the South Korean senior national team for the 2009 Asian Championship, where he was named Best Setter and his team won the bronze medal.

Individual awards

Club
 2010 V-League - Best Setter 
 2011 V-League - Best Setter 
 2016 V-League - Best Setter

National team
 2009 Asian Championship - Best Setter 
 2014 AVC Cup - Best Setter

References

External links
 Han Sun-soo at the International Volleyball Federation (FIVB)

1985 births
Living people
South Korean men's volleyball players
Asian Games medalists in volleyball
Volleyball players at the 2010 Asian Games
Volleyball players at the 2014 Asian Games
Volleyball players at the 2018 Asian Games
Asian Games silver medalists for South Korea
Asian Games bronze medalists for South Korea
Medalists at the 2010 Asian Games
Medalists at the 2014 Asian Games
Medalists at the 2018 Asian Games
People from Bucheon
Sportspeople from Gyeonggi Province
21st-century South Korean people